is a bus company in west of Yamanashi Prefecture, Japan.

Outline
This company established in 1May 1945, as merged into many bus, taxi and railway companies.

Kanemaru Family, which Shin Kanemaru came from, established Yamanashi Kotsu in 1950. Kenji Osano, who was a chief executive operator in Kokusai Kogyo Group, invested into Yamanashi Kotsu and 
became a parent company of that. He helped Yamanashi Kotsu, which was in difficult to operate a lot of deficit routes because he was born in Yamanashi Prefecture.

Yamako Department Store was established by Kokusai Kogyo, and, from the first of establishment until bankruptcy, it connected with Tokyu Group and their department stores.  

In 2009, Kokusai Kogyo transferred all their owned shares to Yamanashi Kotsu employee because Kokusai Kogyo got acquired by Cerberus Capital Management from Osano Family.

History

Establishment in the first time 

Railway business was established in 1897 as Yamanashi Horse Tram opened between Kofu, Yamanashi and Isawa, Yamanashi

Area served
The company's bus lines serve city of Kōfu and vicinities.

Highway Bus

Chūō Kōsoku Bus

Route Buses

Subsidiary companies

 had been a department store company in Yamanashi Prefecture, Japan until 30 September 2019. And, since 30 September 2019, the company has specialized in managing parking areas and properties.

See also
Kokusai Kogyo
Kokusai Tohoku
Tokyu Corporation
Odakyu
Hakone Tozan Railway
Fujikyu
Chikuma Bus

References

External links

Official Website
Desoto Cab Company

Bus companies of Japan
Japanese companies established in 1950
Transport in Yamanashi Prefecture